Baron Thomson is a title in the Peerage of the United Kingdom. It can refer to: 
 
 Baron Thomson, a hereditary title created in 1924 for British statesman Christopher Thomson
 Baron Thomson of Fleet, a hereditary title created in 1964 for Canadian newspaper magnate, Roy Thomson
 Baron Thomson of Monifieth, a life peerage created in 1977 for British politician George Morgan Thomson

Extinct baronies in the Peerage of the United Kingdom
Noble titles created in 1924